The 1989 Campeonato Nacional, was the 57th season of top-flight football in Chile. Colo-Colo won its sixteenth title. Universidad Católica, as Liguilla winners, also qualified for the next Copa Libertadores.

League table

Results

Topscorer

Liguilla Pre-Copa Libertadores

Semifinals

Final 

Universidad Católica qualified for the 1989 Copa Libertadores

Promotion/relegation Liguilla

Promotion play-off match 

Santiago Wanderers promoted to Primera División

See also 
 1989 Copa Digeder
 1989 Copa Invierno

References

External links 
ANFP 
RSSSF Chile 1989

Primera División de Chile seasons
Chile
Primera